Mount Negron, also known as Negron Volcano, is a mountain located on the border of Porac, Pampanga and San Marcelino, Zambales, Philippines at the Zambales Mountains in the region of Central Luzon.
It has a height of 1,583 m (5,194 ft) above sea level, making it the highest point in the province of Pampanga. It is located between Mount Pinatubo and Mount Natib. Mount Negron is the part of the Cabusilan Mountains together with Mount Pinatubo, Mount Cuadrado and Mount Mataba.

Geology 

In the southeast part of the Philippines, the mountain is located 84 km (52 mi) was Manila, the capital of the Philippines. The highest point was Mount Pinatubo, in the Cabusilan Mountains, the mountain is located 5.7 km (3.54 mi) heading northwest to the volcano.

Climate and rainfall

Eruption 
There are no historical eruptions in recorded history. However, according to Philippine Institute of Volcanology and Seismology  (PHIVOLCS), the mountain is listed as potentially active.

References

External links
  - Entry of Mount Pinatubo where Mount Negron is classified as dome subsidiary feature.

Mountains of the Philippines
Geography of Zambales